Keyworth is a large village of Nottinghamshire, England. It is located about 6 miles (11 km) southeast of the centre of Nottingham. It sits on a small, broad hilltop about 200 feet above sea level which is set in the wider undulating boulder clay that characterises the area south of Nottingham.

Keyworth is twinned with the French town of Feignies.

Demographics
A 2001 census which was conducted indicates that the civil parish had a population of 6,920, reducing to 6,733 at the 2011 census.

Crime
Keyworth was the home of Colette Aram who was murdered by Paul Stewart Hutchinson in 1983.

Transport

The bus company Trentbarton operates The Keyworth service from Keyworth to Nottingham via Plumtree, Tollerton, Edwalton and West Bridgford, daily, from early in the morning until around midnight (with additional late-night buses on Fridays and Saturdays).

Keyworth is approximately 8 miles to the closest railway station, Nottingham railway station, Keyworth once had its own station (now on the Old Dalby test track) but it was closed in the 60s. The closest airport located is 17 miles to the west of Keyworth East Midlands Airport.

History and development
Keyworth is first mentioned in writing in the Domesday Book dated 1086, though recent archaeological finds have discovered Roman artefacts in the parish outskirts suggesting human inhabitation of the area as far back as 800 AD. Keyworth originally developed as an agricultural community with the great majority of its inhabitants being farmers and field labourers.
Later, frame-knitting gave rise to local employment and expansion in the 1880s.

Listed buildings in the village includes two grade II barns dating from the 17th century, one late 18th century house built in the Regency style, two early 19th century cottages on Main Street, and two grade II Former framework knitters' workshops.

In the early 20th century the Midland Railway came through Plumtree from Nottingham Midland station & along the north east of Keyworth, giving the village an accessible rail route throughout the railway network, though this luxury only lasted about 70 years. The station at Plumtree was open for passengers from 1880 to 1949.

Significant expansion took place throughout the 1950s, 1960s and 1970s with Keyworth effectively becoming a commuter town for Nottingham. The population has been falling slightly in recent years.

A fuller account can be found at the website of the Keyworth & District History Society.

Churches

The Church of St Mary Magdalene dates from the 14th and 15th centuries and is Grade I listed.

A Methodist church, Baptist church, Catholic church and a United Reformed church are also located in the village.

Education and schools
The South Wolds Academy & Sixth Form (formerly known as South Wolds Community School) is a Secondary School and Sixth Form with academy status located on Church Drive in Keyworth, Nottingham.

There are also three primary schools located in Keyworth (Crossdale Primary School, Keyworth Primary & Nursery School, Willow Brook Primary School).

Recreation
The Keyworth Show takes place each summer, on the second Saturday of July which includes a horticultural show, fairground and various displays. This all takes place on the playing fields described below.

Keyworth Leisure Centre is the areas main swimming pool which is located next to the site of the South Wolds Academy.

The Rectory playing field near the parish church is on the site of an ancient medieval ridge and furrow system. This sometimes made running a rather precarious business for the outfielders of Keyworth Cricket Club who played their home matches on this field until 2012 before moving to the Platt Lane playing fields. In the season 2006 Keyworth Cricket Club players created league records for the most runs in a season and the most centuries in a season. It was the most successful season in the history of the club, which dates back to 1814. An activity park aimed at older children was installed in 2016 on the field and a play park for younger children is across the road in front of Keyworth Primary School.

The Keyworth Turkey Trot is a half-marathon road race which the 1st Keyworth Scout Group has been holding annually since 1983, normally on the second Sunday in December. It attracts hundreds of runners. The race was not run in December 2020 due to ongoing Covid-19 restrictions.

An additional set of playing fields, the home of Keyworth United Community Football Club and Keyworth Cricket Club, is located on Platt Lane.

There is a skate park located on Platt Lane which is made up of concrete ramps on a concrete base.

Stanton-on-the-Wolds Golf Club is situated about a mile from the village centre.

Local groups include scouting, amateur dramatics, bridge, choir, conservation, history, archery, photography, a Martial Arts club (Sanda / Sanshou / Wing Chun), a Karate club (South Notts Shotokan Karate Club) and also a Kickboxing club (Professional Kickboxing Association – Keyworth).

The Keyworth and District Branch of the U3A was established in 2009 and rapidly enrolled over 200 members. By the middle of 2011 it had reached its self-imposed limit of 400 members. It formed more than twenty study and activity groups, such as Play-Reading, Architecture, Family History, French, German, Cycling, Walking, Painting, Book-Reading, Bobbin Lace, Singing for Fun, Ukulele Group, Humour, Wildlife and Bird-Watching.

The Keyworth Village Quiz is an annual quiz held in the Keyworth Village Hall between teams representing local organisations. The quiz, which began in 1976, runs for 7 or 8 weeks with teams competing in University Challenge style head-to-head matches.

Feargus The Musical, a musical based on the political life of Feargus O'Connor, an Irish Chartist leader, was first performed at the South Wolds Academy in November 2018. The musical was written by Keyworth resident Brian Lund and performed by a local cast including dancers from the Keyworth School of Theatre Dance. A second run with the same cast was held at the Nottingham Arts Theatre in November 2019.

Commerce and amenities

The primary healthcare service in Keyworth is a large NHS health centre. There are also two dental practices.

The main shopping precincts are located in the Square, Main Street and the Parade. There is also a smaller set of shops on Nottingham Road.

Keyworth's range of shops includes a post office, pharmacies, small supermarkets, convenience stores, a hardware store, hairdressers, newsagents, butchers, dry-cleaners and florists.  A Bird's Bakery was opened in December 2018. There are no large supermarkets located in Keyworth meaning that many residents commute to other local large supermarkets such as ASDA West Bridgford, Morrisons in Gamston and Tesco in Long Eaton. There was a plan to build a medium-sized Tesco supermarket in Keyworth on the previously derelict Selby Lane site which formerly had a small petrol station located at the site; however, this proposal was declined in March 2010, the proposed plan being rejected by Rushcliffe Borough Council.

There are two Co-op Food stores in the village; a small store in The Square and a bigger one opposite The Parade on Wolds Drive.

There are two veterinary surgeries; Davison's on The Parade and Rushcliffe Veterinary Centre on Main Street.

There are three public houses, the oldest being the Salutation Inn, which was established in the late 15th century.

There are three Chinese takeaways, two fish-and-chip shops, two Indian takeaways and a pizza takeaway.

Keyworth is home to the headquarters of the British Geological Survey, located since 1976 on the site of the former Mary Ward Teacher Training College on Nicker Hill in the North-Eastern quadrant of the village. The college opened in 1968 and was a Roman Catholic institution founded by the Loreto Sisters, also known as the Institute of the Blessed Virgin Mary.

Wolds Wine Estate is an artisan vineyard and glamping lodge site located about 1 mile from the village centre.

Well-known residents and former residents

The former Labour MP, Ed Balls, grew up in Keyworth and attended Crossdale Drive Primary School.

Sam Oldham Olympic bronze medallist, team gymnastics competitor in the London 2012 Olympic Games. Currently residing in Keyworth.

Professor Melanie Leng MBE, Chief Scientist at the British Geological Survey and Director of the Centre for Environmental Geochemistry.  Currently residing in Keyworth.

See also

Keyworth Rugby Club

References

External links

Keyworth and District Local History Society

 
Villages in Nottinghamshire
Civil parishes in Nottinghamshire
Rushcliffe